Madagascar Flying Services (MFS) was a domestic aircraft leasing company in Madagascar from 2002 to 2006.

Aircraft leased
According to the World Bank, the following types were leased 
LET-410UVP 
Cessna 206
Piper PA-31-350
Piper PA-32-300

See also		
 List of defunct airlines of Madagascar

References

Defunct airlines of Madagascar